Baqeran Rural District is in the Central District of Birjand County, South Khorasan province, Iran. At the National Census of 2006, its population was 14,651 in 4,378 households. There were 26,940 inhabitants in 7,497 households at the following census of 2011. At the most recent census of 2016, the population of the rural district was 34,071 in 9,042 households. The largest of its 248 villages was Hajjiabad, with 7,749 people.

References 

Birjand County

Rural Districts of South Khorasan Province

Populated places in South Khorasan Province

Populated places in Birjand County